Frederick Antony Ravi Kumar Zacharias (26 March 194619 May 2020) was an Indian-born Canadian-American Christian evangelical minister and apologist who founded Ravi Zacharias International Ministries (RZIM). He was involved in Christian apologetics for a period spanning more than forty years. Zacharias was the author of more than thirty books on Christianity, He also hosted the radio programs Let My People Think and Just Thinking. He belonged to the Christian and Missionary Alliance, the Keswickian Christian denomination in which he was ordained as a minister.

Multiple sources have posthumously accused Zacharias of serious sexual misconduct. In February 2021 Miller & Martin, the law firm hired by RZIM to look into these allegations, confirmed their veracity. As a result, RZIM issued an apology and subsequently announced that it would undergo a name change and remove all material related to Zacharias. The Christian and Missionary Alliance posthumously revoked his ordination after conducting their own investigation. HarperCollins, which owns the Christian publishers Zondervan and Thomas Nelson, also confirmed that it would take his books out of print and remove him from other published works.

Early life and education 
Ravi Zacharias was born on 26 March 1946 in Madras, India, and grew up in Delhi. He spoke Hindi fluently, the only Indian language that he knew.

Zacharias' family was Anglican, but he was a "skeptic" until the age of 17 when he tried to commit suicide by swallowing poison. While he was in the hospital, a local Christian worker brought him a Bible and told his mother to read to him from John 14, which contains Jesus' words to Thomas the Apostle. Zacharias said it was John 14:19 that touched him as the defining paradigm, "Because I live, you also will live", and that he thought, "This may be my only hope: A new way of living. Life as defined by the Author of Life." Zacharias committed his life to Christ, praying that "Jesus if you are the one who gives life as it is meant to be, I want it. Please get me out of this hospital bed well, and I promise I will leave no stone unturned in my pursuit of truth."

In 1966, Zacharias emigrated with his family to Canada, earning his undergraduate degree from the Ontario Bible College in 1972 (now Tyndale University) and his M.Div. from Trinity International University in 1976. In 1990 he participated in guided study at Ridley Hall, a Church of England theological school in Cambridge, Cambridgeshire, England.

Career

Ministry 

Zacharias spent the summer of 1971 in South Vietnam, where he evangelized U.S. soldiers as well as imprisoned Viet Cong members. After graduating from Ontario Bible College, he began an itinerant ministry with the Christian and Missionary Alliance (C&MA) in Canada. In 1974 the C&MA sent him to Cambodia, where he preached only a short time before its fall to the Khmer Rouge. He was later ordained by the C&MA in 1980, and between 1980 and 1984 he taught at the C&MA-affiliated Alliance Theological Seminary, where he was a professor of evangelism.

In 1983, Zacharias spoke in Amsterdam at the Billy Graham Evangelistic Association's first International Conference for Itinerant Evangelists. After Amsterdam, he spent the summer evangelizing in India, where he continued to see the need for apologetic ministry, both to lead people to Christ and to train Christian leaders. In August 1984, Ravi Zacharias International Ministries (RZIM) was founded in Toronto, Ontario, Canada, to pursue his calling as a "classical evangelist in the arena of the intellectually resistant." Later its headquarters were located in the suburbs of Atlanta, Georgia, United States.

In 1989, shortly after the fall of the Berlin Wall, Zacharias spoke in Moscow with students at the Lenin Military-Political Academy as well as political leaders at the Center for Geopolitical Strategy. This was the first of many evangelism events in the political sphere. Future events included one in Bogotá, Colombia, in 1993, where he spoke to members of the judiciary on the importance of having a solid moral foundation.

The following year, Zacharias wrote his first book, A Shattered Visage: The Real Face of Atheism. In 1992, Zacharias spoke at his first Veritas Forum at Harvard University, and later that year was one of the keynote speakers at Urbana. He continued to be a frequent guest at these forums, both giving lectures and answering students in question-and-answer sessions at academic institutions including the University of Georgia, the University of Michigan, and Penn State.

In 2004, The Church of Jesus Christ of Latter-day Saints (LDS Church) opened its signature pulpit at the Salt Lake Tabernacle to Zacharias for a series of messages. He delivered a sermon on "Who Is the Truth? Defending Jesus Christ as The Way, The Truth and The Life" to some 7,000 lay-persons and scholars from both LDS and Protestant camps in an initiatory move towards open dialogue between the groups. Some evangelicals criticized Zacharias' decision not to use this opportunity to directly address the "deep and foundational" differences between the traditional Christian faith and the teachings of the LDS Church. He responded by asserting that Christians should not immediately condemn so-called the LDS Church's theological differences but "graciously build one step at a time in communicating our faith with clarity and conviction", stating that this would be just as effective as showing someone the faults of their faith. The speaking engagement was nearly sabotaged by an allegation by event organizer Greg Johnson, president of Standing Together, that Zacharias had nothing to do with editing the book The Kingdom of the Cults and had only loaned his name to the latest edition; Johnson later apologized for his comment.

Zacharias was a frequent keynote lecturer within the evangelical community at events including the Future of Truth conference in 2004, the National Religious Broadcasters' Convention and Exposition in 2005, and the National Conference on Christian Apologetics in 2006.  On successive nights in October 2007, he addressed first the students and faculty of Virginia Tech, then the community of Blacksburg, Virginia, on the topic of evil and suffering in the wake of the Virginia Tech massacre. Zacharias represented the evangelical community at occasions such as the National Day of Prayer in Washington, D.C., the Annual Prayer Breakfast at the United Nations, the African Union Prayer Breakfast in Maputo, Mozambique, and was named honorary chairman of the 2008 National Day of Prayer task force. He also participated in the ecumenical Together 2016 meetings, which Pope Francis addressed, describing the event as a valiant effort.

In 2006, Ravi Zacharias along with Wycliffe Hall established the Oxford Centre for Christian Apologetics (OCCA) in Oxfordshire, England though it is now entirely separate from Wycliffe.

In November 2009, Zacharias signed the ecumenical Manhattan Declaration which affirms the sanctity of human life, the dignity of marriage as a union of husband and wife, and freedom of religion as foundational principles of justice and the common good. In 2016, Republican presidential candidate Marco Rubio appointed Zacharias to his anti-abortion "Dignity of Life" advisory panel.

In 2015, according to RZIM's public Form 990 tax return, Zacharias and his wife earned a combined total of $523,926 from the ministry.

Worldview
Zacharias argued that a coherent worldview must be able to satisfactorily answer four questions: that of origin, meaning of life, morality, and destiny. He said that while every major religion makes exclusive claims about truth, the Christian faith is unique in its ability to answer all four of these questions. He routinely spoke on the coherence of the Christian worldview, saying that Christianity is capable of withstanding the toughest philosophical attacks. Zacharias believed that the apologist must argue from three levels: from logic to make it tenable; from feelings to make it liveable; and from whether one has the right to use it to make moral judgments. Zacharias' style of apologetics focused predominantly on Christianity's answers to life's great existential questions with defense of God. He argued that the dominance of the visual in modern communication systems has impacted people's capacity for abstract reasoning altering their way of perceiving things; however, the integration of abstract reasoning into one's worldview is important to have its base grounded in absolutes rather than on relative feelings and fads.

Academic credential controversies
In an earlier edition of his biography and in other literature, Zacharias claimed to have studied at the University of Cambridge and was a visiting professor at the University of Oxford. In multiple speaking engagements he said that he had taken a class in quantum mechanics under John Polkinghorne and while a visiting scholar at Cambridge had heard Stephen Hawking lecture, seeing him struggle between agnosticism and theism. Zacharias often claimed in books and sermons that he was invited to be a visiting scholar at Cambridge, where he focused his studies on Romantic writers and moralist philosophers.

The veracity of Zacharias's purported academic positions at the universities of Oxford and Cambridge was questioned. Christian academic Warren Throckmorton stated that Zacharias "wasn't being truthful" in his claims, pointing out that he had been a visiting scholar at Ridley Hall, a theology school in the city of Cambridge which is unaffiliated with the university. Atheist commentator Steve Baughman also ran a website exposing how Zacharias exaggerated his qualifications.

In 2017, Christianity Today reported accusations that Zacharias had exaggerated his academic credentials; for instance that he had referred to himself in multiple articles and videos with the title "Doctor" or "Dr.", despite lacking a PhD qualification. In response, Zacharias said he had been "conferred ten honorary doctorates" and said further that "in Ravi's homeland of India… honorific titles are customary and are used frequently out of respect for elders, including by the RZIM India team when addressing Ravi." In a statement, RZIM indicated that "[in] earlier years, 'Dr.' did appear before Ravi's name in some of our materials, including on our website, which is an appropriate and acceptable practice with honorary doctorates. However, because this practice can be contentious in certain circles, we no longer use it." Christianity Today reported that Zacharias' online biography was edited following the accusations regarding his credentials.

Sexual abuse
Both before and after his death in May 2020, multiple women alleged that Zacharias had engaged in habitual sexual misconduct and/or abuse. Ruth Malhotra, a former member of RZIM, claims that suspicions regarding Zacharias' behavior had existed during his lifetime but that RZIM employees were not allowed to investigate.

Lori Anne Thompson's lawsuit
In April 2017, Canadians Lori Anne and Brad Thompson sent a demand letter to Zacharias requiring him to pay $5 million in exchange for them refraining from filing a lawsuit that would have accused him of impropriety. Their evidence included text exchanges, which included nude photos sent by Lori Anne Thompson to Zacharias. In response, Zacharias filed a lawsuit accusing the couple of extortion. The case was settled in November 2017 with a non-disclosure agreement. In a statement issued on December 3, 2017, Zacharias said, "Let me state categorically that I never met [Thompson] alone, publicly or privately. The question is not whether I solicited or sent any illicit photos or messages to [her]—I did not, and there is no evidence to the contrary—but rather, whether I should have been a willing participant in any extended communication with a woman, not my wife. The answer, I can unequivocally say, is no, and I fully accept responsibility." He added that he had been "absolutely faithful" to his wife throughout their marriage, but acknowledged that he "failed to exercise wise caution and to protect [himself] from even the appearance of impropriety".

2020 abuse allegations and preliminary report
Four months after Zacharias' death in 2020, three women who worked at two day spas he had co-owned in the Atlanta area came forward alleging that he had sexually harassed multiple massage therapists over the course of five years. According to Christianity Today, Zacharias masturbated in front of one of the women more than fifty times, requested explicit photos of her, and asked for sex on at least two occasions. Other women claimed that Zacharias had inappropriately groped or fondled them. A former business partner, Anurag Sharma, expressed regret at not stopping Zacharias and issued an apology to one of the alleged victims in the Christianity Today article.
  
RZIM initially denied the claims, but subsequently hired the law firm Miller & Martin to conduct an investigation. Miller & Martin engaged the services of a private investigation firm consisting of former federal law enforcement officers. The investigators interviewed more than fifty people, including more than a dozen massage therapists, and accessed data from four mobile devices used by Zacharias. On December 23, 2020, RZIM confirmed that the allegations were true and released a preliminary report from the investigation, which concluded:

Full report and subsequent allegations
On 11 February 2021, RZIM released the full results of its investigation, concluding that there was credible evidence that Zacharias had engaged in sexual misconduct. Accordingly, it was found that Zacharias solicited and received sexually explicit photos from more than 200 women who were in their early twenties until a few months before his death in 2020. According to investigators, Zacharias also used thousands of dollars of ministry funds which had been dedicated to a "humanitarian effort" to pay for massage therapists, providing them housing, schooling, and monthly support for extended periods of time.

In an article on the report, The Gospel Coalition noted that, 

On Zacharias' financial irregularities, The Gospel Coalition further noted from the report that RZIM would pay rent for Zacharias to stay at his own apartment while in Bangkok. They wrote, 

Christianity Today while reporting on the findings wrote that,

Vicki Blue maintains that Zacharias threatened to make her and her daughter Becca (who was also abused) miserable if she disclosed abuse.  She stated,  “Ravi kept talking about an anonymous donor that he could get limitless money from,” Blue said. “He said, ‘I can keep it going and make your life miserable until you die.’”  Blue said initially Zacharias helped a great deal over her spiritual confusion and she thought he was, “the closest person to God other than Jesus.”  Later Zacharias maintained his marriage was unsatisfactory and maintained Blue was “his soulmate” and he, “couldn’t survive without (her),”  Blue maintains Zacharias put his hand into her groin and continued sexual advances after she said, “no”.  Zacharias exposed himself and masturbated in front of her 50 to 100 times, he twice asked her to have sex but she refused.  At the time Blue believed Zacharias was in love with her.  She claims she was confused and vulnerable, stating, “It’s hard to explain. When someone gives you spiritual advice and you know everything he says about God is true, yet he’s also doing these things to you—it took years of therapy to realize I didn’t do anything wrong.”  Blue was persuaded to open a spa with Zacharias as a co-owner and it failed financially.  Blue maintains her daughter Becca said Zacharias molested her and six other spa therapists also complained he had done something perverted or molested them.  “I realized then how much I had been used and manipulated,” Blue stated.

In an interview, Shirley Steward, a retired Ontario Provincial Police Officer, recounts that Ravi Zacharias, who was already a Christian minister at the time, pressured her to have an abortion after she became pregnant as a teenager by his brother Ramesh.

Repercussions
In their release of the full report, the board of RZIM stated that it was "shocked and grieved by Ravi's actions", and apologized to his victims: "Words cannot come close to expressing the sorrow that we feel for what you have been through or the gratitude we feel for the bravery with which you have responded." Carson Weitnauer, a former RZIM employee, referred to Zacharias "one of [his generation's] greatest frauds," a "sexual predator", and a "uniquely charismatic manipulator."

On Feb 12, 2021, Zacharias Trust, the UK branch of RZIM, decided to change its name and cut ties to the parent ministry, criticizing their response to the scandal as inadequate. By Feb 24, RZIM Africa had suspended its operations while RZIM itself scaled back its website. On March 8, RZIM stated it would alter its name and remove all material related to Zacharias. As a result of falling donations, RZIM decided to make 60% of its workforce worldwide redundant and changed from running evangelists and apologists to making grants to other organizations, supporting evangelism and "the prevention of and caring for victims of sexual abuse." In addition, RZIM Canada began winding down operations.

On Feb. 12, 2021 The IWU Society of World Changers Committee unanimously voted to remove Ravi Zacharias from the Society of World Changers.  

On Feb. 19, 2021, the Alliance World Fellowship revoked Zacharias' ordination after its own investigation confirmed a "pattern of predatory behaviour." HarperCollins Christian Publishing, which includes Zondervan and Thomas Nelson, confirmed that it would no longer sell books by Zacharias and that it was working with Christian author Lee Strobel to remove Zacharias from other works.

In early August 2021, the Brad Sohn Law Firm filed a lawsuit on behalf of several former RZIM donors, including NFL player Derek Carrier and his wife Dora, seeking the return of donations they had given to RZIM between 2004 and 9 February 2021. The plaintiffs asserted that they donated to RZIM believing it was to finance spreading the Christian message when in fact the money financed Zacharias' predatory behavior.

Personal life
On 7 May 1972, Zacharias married Margaret "Margie" Reynolds, whom he met at his church's youth group. They had three children, Sarah, Nathan, and Naomi. He lived in Atlanta, Georgia.

In March 2020, Zacharias announced that he had been diagnosed with sarcoma of the sacrum, and on 19 May 2020, he died of that cancer at his home in Atlanta at the age of 74. Following his death, a number of high-profile Christians posted messages online detailing Zacharias's influence upon them.

Then-White House press secretary Kayleigh McEnany and then-U.S. Vice President Mike Pence were among many who expressed their sympathies for Zacharias following his death.

Bibliography
A Shattered Visage: The Real Face of Atheism (1994, 2004) 
Can Man Live Without God? (1994, 1996) 
 Deliver Us from Evil (1996, 1998) 
Cries of the Heart (1998, 2002) 
The Merchant and the Thief (1999; children's) 
The Broken Promise (2000; children's) 
Jesus Among Other Gods (2000, 2002) 
Jesus Among Other Gods (youth ed., 2000) 
The Lotus and the Cross: Jesus Talks with Buddha (2001) 
Sense and Sensuality: Jesus Talks with Oscar Wilde (2002) 
Light in the Shadow of Jihad: The Struggle For Truth (2002) 
Recapture the Wonder (2003) 
Is Your Church Ready?: Motivating Leaders to Live an Apologetic Life (2003) (Editor, with Norman Geisler) 
Who Made God? And Answers to Over 100 Other Tough Questions of Faith (2003) (General editor, with Norman Geisler) 
The Kingdom of the Cults (2003) (Editor) 
I, Isaac Take Thee, Rebekah: Moving From Romance to Lasting Love (2004) 
The Prince and the Prophet: Jesus Talks With Mohammed (copyright 2004, to be released posthumously) 
The Lamb and the Führer: Jesus Talks with Hitler (2005) 
 , 205 pp.
 The Grand Weaver: How God Shapes Us Through the Events of Our Lives (2007) 
Beyond Opinion: Living the Faith We Defend (2008) 
The End of Reason: A Response to the New Atheists (2008) 
Is There Not a Cause (2008; National Day of Prayer Feature Book) ; Audio CD .
New Birth or Rebirth: Jesus Talks with Krishna (2008) 
There is a Plan (2009) (excerpts from The Grand Weaver) 
Has Christianity Failed You? (2010) 
The Lotus and the Cross: Jesus Talks with Buddha (2010) 
Why Jesus? Rediscovering His Truth in an Age of Mass Marketed Spirituality (2012) 
The Lamb and the Führer (graphic novel, 2014) 
Why Suffering? Finding Meaning and Comfort When Life Doesn't Make Sense (2014) 
 with Vince Vitale, Jesus Among Secular Gods: The Countercultural Claims of Christ (2017) 
The Logic of God: 52 Christian Essentials for the Heart and Mind (2019) 
 with Abdu Murray, Seeing Jesus from The East: A Fresh Look at History's Most Influential Figure (2020)

References

External links

 Official RZIM website
 Defending Ravi

1946 births
2020 deaths
20th-century American male writers
20th-century American non-fiction writers
20th-century American philosophers
20th-century Canadian philosophers
20th-century evangelicals
20th-century Indian philosophers
21st-century American male writers
21st-century American non-fiction writers
21st-century American philosophers
21st-century Canadian philosophers
21st-century evangelicals
American evangelicals
American male non-fiction writers
American male writers of Indian descent
American people of Indian Tamil descent
Arminian writers
Canadian evangelicals
Canadian male non-fiction writers
Canadian people of Indian descent
Christian apologists
Christian philosophers
Christians from Georgia (U.S. state)
Converts to Christianity from atheism or agnosticism
Critics of atheism
Deaths from cancer in Georgia (U.S. state)
Evangelical writers
Indian emigrants to Canada
Indian emigrants to the United States
Indian evangelicals
Keswickianism
Members of the Christian and Missionary Alliance
Religious scandals
Sexual abuse scandals in Protestantism
Trinity Evangelical Divinity School alumni
Tyndale University College and Seminary alumni
Writers from Atlanta
Writers from Chennai